Provespa is a small genus of Vespidae, made up of nocturnal wasps from Southeast Asia, sometimes referred to as "night wasps" or "night hornets", though they are not true hornets (genus Vespa). They are the only nocturnal members of the subfamily Vespinae, and also the only vespines where new colonies are formed by swarming (one queen attended by a large number of workers, similar to honey bees). They tend to build their nests from fibrous plant material, making them a uniform greyish brown colour which is often difficult to locate.

Species
 Provespa anomala (Saussure, 1854)
 Provespa barthelemyi (Buysson, 1905)
 Provespa nocturna Vecht, 1935

References

External links 
Hornets of Malaysia
https://web.archive.org/web/20080930200541/http://users.skynet.be/fa968040/VESPIDAE/Genus_Provespa.htm
https://web.archive.org/web/20070331123043/http://www.sci.ibaraki.ac.jp/~jkrte/wasp/vespinae/Provespa.html

Vespidae
Fauna of Southeast Asia
Taxa named by William Harris Ashmead